United Nations Security Council resolution 1046, adopted unanimously on 13 February 1996, after recalling previous resolutions including Resolution 1027 (1995) on the extension of the United Nations Preventive Deployment Force (UNPREDEP) until 30 May 1996, the Council authorised an increase in strength of UNPREDEP of an additional 50 military personnel for support in its operations.

The council also authorised the establishment of the position of Force Commander of UNPREDEP, and requested the Secretary-General to report by 20 May 1996 on the situation in the region and matters relating to UNPREDEP.

See also
 Bosnian War
 Breakup of Yugoslavia
 Croatian War of Independence
 List of United Nations Security Council Resolutions 1001 to 1100 (1995–1997)
 Yugoslav Wars

References

External links
 
Text of the Resolution at undocs.org

 1046
 1046
1996 in Yugoslavia
1996 in the Republic of Macedonia
 1046
February 1996 events